In United States maritime law, the Limitation of Liability Act of 1851, codified as  since February 1, 2010, states that the owner of a vessel may limit damage claims to the value of the vessel at the end of the voyage plus "pending freight", as long as the owner can prove it lacked knowledge of the problem beforehand. This Act was the subject of a 2001 United States Supreme Court case in Lewis v. Lewis & Clark Marine, Inc.

History
The Act was passed by Congress on March 3, 1851 to protect the maritime shipping industry; at the time, shipowners were subject to loss from events beyond their control such as storms and pirates, so the Act was designed to limit the shipowners' liability to the value of the vessel. Without it, American shipping was "at a competitive disadvantage" compared to other maritime countries where similar limitations applied.

Section 3 of the 1851 Act states "the liability of the owner or owners of any ship or vessel ... shall in no case exceed the amount or value of the interest of such owner or owners respectively, in such ship or vessel, and her freight then pending". The 1851 Act was later codified as Rev. Stat. §4282–4289, with Section 3 forming Rev. Stat. §4283.

The original bill was subsequently amended many times:
 1871, which added Rev. Stat. §4281
 1875, which modified Rev. Stat. §4289 with an editorial correction
 1877, which modified Rev. Stat. §4284 with an editorial correction
 1884, the Shipping Act of 1884, which limited an individual owner's liability to the owner's share of debts and liabilities, later codified as 46 U.S.C. Appendix Ch.8 §§189
 1886, which modified Rev. Stat. §4289 to clarify which vessels are covered
 1893, the Harter Act, which was later codified as 46 U.S.C. Appendix Ch.8 §§190–196
 1935, which modified Rev. Stat. §4283 and added §4283A
 1936, which modified Rev. Stat. §4283, §4285, and §4289; and added §4283B
 1940, which repealed 46 U.S.C. Appendix Ch.8 §§175
 1984, which modified Rev. Stat. §4283
 1992, which modified Rev. Stat. §4283B
 1993, which modified Rev. Stat. §4283B
 1996, which modified Rev. Stat. §4283 and §4283B
 2010, which moved the code to 

The 1936 amendment clarified whether the act applied to foreign shipowners; previously, the 1851 Act stated the owner of "any ship or vessel" could limit their liability, whether domestic or foreign, which was affirmed by an 1876 court decision. The 1936 amendment made explicit the applicability to foreign shipowners, stating "The liability of the owner of any vessel, whether American or foreign ... shall not, except in the cases provided for ... exceed the amount or value of the interest of such owner in such vessel, and her freight then pending".

Rev. Stat. §4281–89 eventually were moved to 46 U.S.C. App.

Invocation
Historically, the statute has been invoked to limit the liability of certain parties in the sinking of RMS Titanic (1912), the Deepwater Horizon oil spill (2010), and the sinking of MV Conception (2019).

Recent developments

The Deepwater Horizon Survivors' Fairness Act was introduced in the Senate and sought to amend the Limitation of Liability Act to make an exception for personal injuries and wrongful death claims related to the explosion and destruction of the Deepwater Horizon oil drilling platform. It was referred to the Committee on Commerce, Science, and Transportation. The Congressional Budget Office provided a cost estimate.

Parallel bills were introduced simultaneously in the House and Senate in September 2021 to amend the Limitation of Liability Act. As originally written, the bills would take effect retroactively to September 2, 2019 and apply to the sinking of MV Conception.

References

Public liability
United States federal admiralty and maritime legislation